Trnovac is a village in the municipality of Kratovo, North Macedonia.

Demographics
According to the 2002 census, the village had a total of 330 inhabitants. Ethnic groups in the village include:

Macedonians 330

References

Villages in Kratovo Municipality